General Secretary or First Secretary is the official title of leaders of most communist parties. When a communist party is the ruling party in a Communist-led one-party state, the General Secretary is typically the country's de facto leader—though sometimes this leader also holds state-level positions (such as a presidency or premiership) in order to hold de jure leadership of the state as well. One exception to this rule is the People's Republic of China from 1978 to 1990 where the chairman and then General Secretary of the Communist Party were subordinate to elder Deng Xiaoping who was the de facto Paramount leader of China.

Leaders of current communist parties

Leaders of former communist parties

See also
Secretary (title)
Secretary-general

References

External links

Chief executive officers
 
Management occupations
Positions of authority
Titles